Bless you is a common English expression.

Bless You may also refer to:

Songs
"Bless You" (Tony Orlando song), 1961
"Bless You" (Martha and the Vandellas song), 1971
"Bless You", by John Lennon from Walls and Bridges, 1974
"Bless You (Save You, Spare You, Damn You)", by The Stranglers from Suite XVI, 2006

Other uses
Bless You, Prison, a 2002 Romanian drama film